Loonee Tunes! is the second album by British 2 Tone and ska band Bad Manners, from the year 1980. In keeping with the format of their first album, the first track is an instrumental. It reached number 36 on the UK album chart. The album opens with "Echo 4-2" which became the band's cult instrumental introduction number at all live gigs.

Track listing
All songs by Bad Manners unless noted.

 "Echo 4-2" (L. Johnson)
 "Just a Feeling"
 "El Pussycat" (Roland Alphonso)
 "Doris"
 "Spy-I"
 "Tequila" (The Champs)
 "Lorraine"
 "Echo Gone Wrong"
 "Suicide"
 "The Undersea Adventures of Ivor The Engine"
 "Back in '60"
 "Just Pretendin'"

 2011 Bonus Tracks
 "Lorraine" (Extended Version) – 6:20
 "Here Comes The Major" (New Version) – 3:23

Personnel
Bad Manners
Buster Bloodvessel – vocals
Louis "Alphonso" Cook – guitar
David Farren – bass
Martin Stewart – keyboards
Chris Kane – saxophone
Andrew Marson – saxophone
Paul "Gus" Hyman – trumpet
Winston Bazoomies – harmonica, vocals

1980 albums
Bad Manners albums
Magnet Records albums